Mel Gorham  (born Marilyn Schnier, October 27, 1959) is an American actress who is best known for her role as Violet in Wayne Wang's films Smoke and Blue in the Face. Gorham is from Miami, Florida, and is of Cuban and Jewish descent.

Gorham's improvised rendition of Peggy Lee's "Fever" in Blue in the Face garnered her much critical acclaim and press. Major film roles in Curdled and Cop Land followed. In 1997, Gorham was then cast to star in an NBC sitcom loosely based on her life titled Union Square. But after the pilot was filmed, the producers replaced her with Constance Marie.

Gorham returned to the world of New York City theater where she began. After a long absence, she returned to film with a role in Wayne Wang's 2001 film The Center of the World. In 2012, she retired from show business and currently resides in South Beach.

Filmography
 1990 - Awakenings as Nurse Sara
 1993 - Carlito's Way as Pachanga's date
 1995 - Smoke as Violet
 1995 - Blue in the Face as Violet
 1995 - The Perez Family as Vilma & Raquel
 1996 - Curdled as Elena
 1997 - Cop Land as Monica Lopez
 1997 - Wishful Thinking as Lourdes
 2001 - The Center of the World as Roxanne
 2005 - Sueno as Gloria
 2006 - Delirious as Tish
 2007 - Mother's Day Massacre as Dolores
 2009 - American Cowslip as Kimberly
 2011 - A Talent for Trouble as Francine Hawk
 2011 - The Trouble with Cali as Xiomara

References

External links
 
 Official site

Living people
American film actresses
American stage actresses
American people of Cuban descent
American people of Jewish descent
Actresses from Miami
1959 births